Dylan Young (born 29 January 1989) is an Australian racing driver from Melbourne, Australia.

Early life 
Dylan Young was born in Melbourne, Australia. He attended Trinity Grammar School in Kew, Victoria. He grew up close to the Albert Park Circuit, home of the Australian Grand Prix. He now lives in Melbourne, having spent some time living overseas in Phuket, Thailand.

Career
Dylan Young started his motorsport career in karts at the relatively late age of 17 in 2007.

2010–2011: Formula BMW
Young made his open wheeler debut in the Formula BMW Pacific championship at the 2010 Petronas Malaysian Formula One Grand Prix. He drove for British team Motaworld Racing before budget constraints forced him to be sidelined until later in the season when he rejoined the championship alongside the Singapore Formula One Grand Prix weekend.

Young continued on in the same Formula BMW championship for 2011 which was rebranded to the JK Racing Asia Series. He made the switch to Canadian team Atlantic Racing but much like the previous season faced further financial difficulties and as a result missed a number of races. Young's strongest races of the season came at rounds 11 and 12 which were held at the 2011 Singapore Formula One Grand Prix. Despite being out of the car for some months due to his budget issues, Young managed to qualify in 5th position before both he and his teammate were disqualified after the two Atlantic Racing Team cars had been found with a technical error. With the penalty pushing Young to the back of the grid for both races, he then went on to climb through the field to 8th and 6th places respectively.

2012–2013: MRF Challenge – Formula 3
Young made the move to the MRF Challenge Formula 2000 Championship for 2012, featuring a faster car than the Formula BMW he drove for the previous two seasons. Young went on to score points finishes inside the top ten at races 4 and 5 of the 2012 championship.

His most promising results during this period came in round 4 of the 2013/2014 Championship held at the MMRT Circuit in Chennai in February, 2014. Young finished in 3rd on two occasions for a double podium finish with other strong drives inside the top 5. Young finished a strong 7th in the Championship out of 22 drivers with the field including the likes of Arthur Pic (GP2 driver), Tio Ellinas (former Marussia F1 test driver, GP2 and Formula Renault 3.5 driver) and Harry Tincknell (FIA World Endurance LMP1 driver with Nissan).

2014–2016: MRF Challenge and GP3 Series 
Young endured a difficult 2014 MRF Challenge Championship mostly brought about by a low scoring final round at the MMRT Circuit in India during January, 2015 which didn't reflect the strong pace he showed in Bahrain where he was racing at the front of the grid.

Young completed a GP3 Series test with the Hilmer Motorsport team, the official GP3 partner of the Sahara Force India Formula 1 Team at the post season test held at the Yas Marina Formula 1 Circuit in Abu Dhabi during November 2014. As a result of the test, Young was said to be targeting a move into the GP3 Series or Auto GP for the 2015 Season.

The 2015 MRF Challenge Championship saw Young return to the Championship which featured 14 races across Abu Dhabi, Bahrain, Dubai and Chennai. Young's best finish of the season came in Dubai where he finished 6th place and he finished the season in 13th place in the standings out of a field of 28 drivers.

Young again returned for the 2016/2017 MRF Challenge Championship where he was teammates with Mick Schumacher, son of seven-time Formula One World Champion Michael Schumacher. He finished the season in 9th place in the Championship standings out of a field of 22 drivers. His best race result of the season came in Dubai in 5th place.

2017–2019: MRF Challenge – Formula 3 

For the 2017 MRF Challenge Championship, Young finished 8th in the Championship standings out of 19 drivers with a best finish of third place on the podium in Round 1 at the Bahrain International Circuit.

Young achieved two podiums during the 2018/2019 MRF Challenge, finishing in third place at the Bahrain International Circuit, and in second place at the MMRT Circuit in Chennai. He finished the Championship in 6th place out of 16 drivers.

The 2019/2020 MRF Challenge Championship was Young's best season to date as he was crowned Vice Champion, finishing runner up in the Championship behind Michelangelo Amendola and ahead of Josh Mason in third place. Dylan finished the season with a total of nine podiums with wins at the Dubai Autodrome, the final race of the season in Chennai and in Bahrain where he finished ahead of David Schumacher, son of former Formula One Driver Ralf Schumacher.

2020: Europe, Australia and COVID-19 
Young was set to be targeting a move to Europe for the 2020 season whilst also receiving offers to compete in the new S5000 open-wheeler Championship in Australia. Currently, he has yet to announce where he will race for the 2020 season due to the current COVID-19 pandemic.

2021: Formula 3 Regional in Europe 
Young made the move to Europe for the 2021 season and completed a part campaign with French team Graff Racing in the Formula 3 Regional category of the Ultimate Cup Series. He was immediately on the pace, placing on the podium in each race at his debut round at the Paul Ricard Circuit in France. In Race 3 of the weekend, he secured the fastest lap and passed Nico Prost, son of Formula One World Champion Alain Prost on his way to second place.  

Young kept his podium run alive with another 3 podiums at the next round at the Le Mans Circuit in France.  However, his podium run came to an end at the Magny Cours Circuit in October. Despite qualifying in third, a retirement in Race 1 meant Young had to start further back in Races 2 and 3, yet he managed to come through the field to finish in 4th place for the final two races. 

As Young only competed in half the season, and missed the last round (where more points were on offer), it was evident he would have been fighting for the title had he managed to complete the season.

Racing record

Career summary

Complete MRF Challenge Formula 2000 Championship results 
(key) (Races in bold indicate pole position; races in italics indicate fastest lap)

† Did not finish, but classified.

References

External links
 Official Website

1989 births
Living people
Racing drivers from Melbourne
MRF Challenge Formula 2000 Championship drivers
Formula BMW Pacific drivers
Motaworld Racing drivers
Graff Racing drivers
People educated at Trinity Grammar School, Kew